Easton is a village on the Isle of Wight. It is located close to Totland on the west side of the island., and forms part of the parish of Freshwater. (where the population at the 2011 Census was included)

References

Villages on the Isle of Wight